The Negro Sailor is a 1945 documentary short film made for the U.S. Navy and shown by All-American News, a company producing newsreels and later feature films for the race film market. It was directed by Henry Levin. The film was inspired by the success of the film The Negro Soldier, and was one of only five films documenting the war time activities of African Americans in a positive light before 1950. Released after the surrender of Japan the film highlights the service of African Americans seaman.

Plot
At an African-American newspaper, Bill Johnson, one of the employees enlists in the US Navy. Frank Roberts, the sports editor for the paper convinces the newspaper's editor it would be a great idea for the paper to publish a column called "The Navy Team" where Frank would write about Frank's experience in the Navy.

The film follows Bill from Recruit Training Command, Great Lakes, Illinois including a spell in the brig to a variety of technical training. Bill later serves on a ship escorting a destroyer with a crew of other African-Americans working under white officers. The film mentions several black war heroes of World War II including Navy Cross recipients William Pinckney for his actions at the Battle of Santa Cruz Islands, Doris Miller for his actions at Pearl Harbor, and Leonard Roy Harmon for his actions during the Naval Battle of Guadalcanal.

Production

The Negro Sailor was filmed at Columbia Studios and completed in July 1945.

Release and legacy

Caleb Peterson, Jr., the founder of the Interracial Film & Radio Guild, praised the Columbia Studios executives for including him in discussions in developing film. However, the film was also seen as "an attempt to polish the notoriously racist reputation of the navy—made worse by events such as the Port Chicago mutiny—among African Americans". And while this film and The Negro Soldier "acknowledged African Americans' contributions to America's military history, by overlooking the persistence of racial segregation in the armed forced, they implied that the black struggle for civil rights was complete".

The film is included as a supplement to releases of Harry Levin’s films The Family Secret and Convicted. The film was also released on a 2010 DVD set of race films and was restored in 2016.

The film is stored in the U.S. National Archives and Records Administration.

Cast
Joel Fluellen as Bill Johnson
Spencer Williams Jr. as Frank Roberts
Leigh Whipper as the Editor
Monica Carter
Joan Douglas
Mildred Boyd
Louise Franklin

See also
The Negro Soldier

Notes

External links

The Negro Sailor at the National Archives

1945 films
American short documentary films
1940s short documentary films
American black-and-white films
Black-and-white documentary films
Films directed by Henry Levin
African-American films
African-American history of the United States military
American World War II propaganda films
1940s English-language films